Catascopus elegans is a ground beetle species in the genus Catascopus found in South East Asia and Australia.

References

External links 

 Carabidae of the World
 

Lebiinae
Beetles described in 1801